The Philadelphia Naval Asylum is a complex of buildings at Gray's Ferry Avenue in Philadelphia, Pennsylvania. Built in 1827 as a hospital, it later housed the Philadelphia Naval School, served as a home for retired sailors for the United States Navy from 1834 to 1976, and was ultimately redeveloped as luxury condominiums. The site was placed on the National Register of Historic Places and designated a National Historic Landmark in 1971, primarily for its architecture.

For seven years, from 1838 until 1845, the campus housed the Philadelphia Naval School, a precursor to the United States Naval Academy. Beginning in 1838, midshipmen approaching examinations for promotion were assigned to the school for eight months of study. In 1842, William Chauvenet was placed in charge of the school and formalized much of the study. When the Naval Academy was formed in 1845, four of the seven faculty members came from the Philadelphia school.

On July 1, 1889, its name was changed to Naval Home. In 1976, the Naval Home was moved to Gulfport, Mississippi, after it was determined that the Philadelphia facility could not be economically expanded and modernized.

In 1988, the property was sold to residential developer Toll Brothers. The main building was damaged by arsonists in 2003. It has since been restored as luxury condominiums.

See also

Schuylkill Arsenal
Naval Square, Philadelphia
List of National Historic Landmarks in Philadelphia
National Register of Historic Places listings in South Philadelphia

References

External links

Philadelphia Area Consortium of Special Collections Libraries
Naval Square
Records of the U.S. Naval Home, Philadelphia, 1831-1936, MS 247 held by Special Collections & Archives, Nimitz Library at the United States Naval Academy

Hospital buildings completed in 1827
Hospital buildings completed in 1833
Military academies of the United States
History of Philadelphia
National Historic Landmarks in Pennsylvania
Hospitals in Philadelphia
Closed installations of the United States Navy
Old soldiers' homes in the United States
Southwest Center City, Philadelphia
1827 establishments in Pennsylvania
National Register of Historic Places in Philadelphia